The discography of German record production duo, Cubeatz. It includes a list of songs produced, co-produced and remixed by year, artists, album and title.

Singles produced

2011

Fard – Invictus
07. "Einsam" 
08. "S.O.S." 
10. "Dann Bist Du Häuptling" 
16. "Erinnerungen" 
17. "60 Terrorbars Las Vegas"

Bosca – Fighting Society
01. "Intro"
03. "Zeilen Die Für Dich Rappen"
05. "Tausende Stunden"
06. "So Mächtig"
08. "Bosca The Heat"
09. "Scheinwelt"
11. "Doch Wieder"
12. "Endmusik" (featuring Vega)
13. "Kannst Du Sehen?"
16. "Alles Gesagt"

2012

Vega – Vincent
01. "Vincent Ist Da"
03. "So Weit Weg"
04. "Feuer"

Farid Bang – Der letzte Tag deines Lebens
16. "Weißer Krieger" (featuring L Nino)

Haftbefehl – Kanackiş
02. "An Alle Bloxx"

2013

Timeless – 00:00
07. "Der Morgen Danach" (featuring Vega)

2015

Vega – Kaos
03. "1312"
05. "Hip-Hop & Rap"

Farid Bang – Asphalt Massaka 3
12. "FDM"

KC Rebell – Fata Morgana
08. "Porzellan" (featuring Maxim)

G-Eazy
00. "Oh Well"

Joell Ortiz – Human
01. "Human (Intro)" 
03. "I Just Might" 
04. "My Niggas" 
10. "Bad Santa" (featuring Jared Evan)

PA Sports – Eiskalter Engel
17. "Am Ziel"

Hanybal
00. "Money"

Fard
08. "HuckleberryFinnPhase (Mezzanin)"

2016

Lil Uzi Vert – Lil Uzi Vert vs. the World
04. "Grab the Wheel"

Drake – Views
05. "Hype"

Luu Breeze – Something in the Shade
06. "NuhFaceNuhTime"

Juicy J and Wiz Khalifa – TGOD Mafia: Rude Awakening
06. "I See It I Want It" 
09. "Bossed Up" 
10. "She in Love" 
14. "Stay the Same" 
16. "Cell Ready"

Tru Life
00. "Bag for It" (featuring Rick Ross and Velous)

Snoop Dogg – Coolaid
05. "Coolaid Man"

PartyNextDoor and Jeremih
00. "Like Dat" (featuring Lil Wayne)

Jeremih – Late Nights: Europe
04. "Lebanon" 
09. "Stockholm"

PartyNextDoor
00. "Buzzin" (featuring Lil Yachty)

Lil Uzi Vert – The Perfect Luv Tape
09. "Ronda (winners)"

Joell Ortiz
00. "Talk My Shit"

Travis Scott
00. "Black Mass"

Travis Scott – Birds in the Trap Sing McKnight
03. "Coordinate" (featuring Blac Youngsta) 
04. "Through the Late Night" (featuring Kid Cudi) 
07. "Sweet Sweet"

Gucci Mane – Woptober
11. "Hi-Five"

Meek Mill – DC4
07. "Lights Out" (featuring Don Q) 
09. "Offended" (featuring Young Thug and 21 Savage)

Kool Savas – Essahdamus
13. "On & On" (featuring PA Sports, Gentleman and Vega)

Travis Scott
00. "RaRa" (featuring Lil Uzi Vert)

24hrs – 12:AM
03. "Monster Truck"

Rick Ross
00. "No U-Turns"

Juicy J – #MustBeNice
05. "Lotto" 
06. "Whatcha Gone Do" 
12. "Panties" (featuring Jeremih)

Kid Ink – RSS2
02. "Before the Checks" (featuring Casey Veggies)

Young Thug
00. "I Might" (featuring 21 Savage)

Shindy – Dreams
12. "Zahlen" 
13. "Laas Abi Skit"

Murda Beatz – Keep God First
04. "More" (featuring PartyNextDoor and Quavo) 
11. "Brown Money" (featuring Jay Whiss) 
12. "9 Times Out of 10" (featuring Ty Dolla Sign)

Skeme – Paranoia
03. "Obession" 
04. "2X"

Gucci Mane – The Return of East Atlanta Santa
05. "Stutter" 
08. "Yet"

2017

PnB Rock – GTTM: Goin Thru the Motions
14. "Stand Back" (featuring A Boogie wit da Hoodie)

Wifisfuneral – When Hell Falls
05. "Hunnits, Fifties" (featuring Yung Bans)

Sean Leon – I Think You've Gone Mad (Or the Sins of the Father)
11. "Favourite Rapper / Hundred Million Religion"

Future – Hndrxx
01. "My Collection" 
17. "Sorry"

Profit
00. "Ain't Rich Yet" (featuring Dave East)

Drake – More Life
02. "No Long Talk" (featuring Giggs) 
11. "Portland" (featuring Quavo and Travis Scott)

King Z3us – King Z3us
03. "Commas"

Juicy J – Gas Face
09. "Leanin" (featuring Chris Brown and Quavo)

Rich the Kid
00. "Ain't Ready" (featuring Jay Critch and Famous Dex)

Gucci Mane – Droptopwop
02. "Tho" 
04. "Helpless" 
06. "Finesse the Plug" (Interlude) 
07. "Dance with the Devil"

A.Chal – On Gaz
06. "Past Chick" (featuring Axlfolie)

PartyNextDoor
02. "Don't Tell Me" (featuring Jeremih)

21 Savage – Issa Album
13. "Whole Lot" (featuring Young Thug)

AR-Ab
00. "No Smoke" (featuring Velous)

French Montana – Jungle Rules
11. "Push Up"

Nav – Perfect Timing
05. "Held Me Down" 
07. "Did You See Nav?" 
013. "Need Some" (featuring Gucci Mane)

Bebe Rexha – All Your Fault: Pt. 2
01. "That's It" (featuring Gucci Mane and 2 Chainz)

Vory – Lucky Me
04. "9.22"

Kodak Black – Project Baby 2
03. "Roll in Peace" (featuring XXXTentacion)

Lil Uzi Vert – Luv Is Rage 2
04. "No Sleep Leak"

Brain – I'm Brain
03. "Whippin' It Up" (featuring Lil Dicky)

Gucci Mane – Mr. Davis
01. "Work in Progress (Intro)" 
15. "Jump Out the Whip

Maino – Party & Pain
04. "Bag Talk" (featuring Dave East and Jaquae)

21 Savage, Offset and Metro Boomin – Without Warning
04. "My Choppa Hate Niggas" (performed by 21 Savage and Metro Boomin) 
09. "Still Serving"

88Glam – 88Glam
08. "Give n Go"

Dave East – Karma
16. "Feeling a Way" (featuring D Jones)

Lil Duke – Uberman 2
03. "Double" (featuring Offset)

DRAM – Big Baby DRAM
21. "Good Thang" (featuring Casey Veggies)

Quality Control – Quality Control: Control the Streets Volume 1
19. "Thick & Pretty" (performed by Quality Control with Migos)

XXXTentacion – A Ghetto Christmas Carol
01. "A Ghetto Christmas Carol"

G-Eazy – The Beautiful & Damned
02. "Pray for Me"

Travis Scott and Quavo – Huncho Jack, Jack Huncho
07. "Go" 
10. "Moon Rock" 
12. "Where U From"

Famous Dex – Read About It
01. "Up" (featuring Ski Mask the Slump God and Reggie Mills)

2018

Rich Brian – Amen
05. "Attention" (featuring Offset)

Young Sizzle – Trap Ye: Season 2
15. "Murder They Wrote Pt. II"

Kendrick Lamar and various artists – Black Panther: The Album
01. "Black Panther" (performed by Kendrick Lamar) 
07. "Paramedic!" (performed by SOB X RBE) 
13. "Big Shot" (performed by Kendrick Lamar and Travis Scott)

FKi 1st – Good Gas
01. "Good Gas" (featuring MadeinTYO and Uno The Activist)

Ronny J – OMGRonny
05. "Costa Rica" (featuring Ski Mask The Slump God)

Nessly – Wildflower
11. "Sorry Not Sorry"

Vic Mensa
00. "Dim Sum" (with Valee)

Cardi B – Invasion of Privacy
13. "I Do" (featuring SZA)

Smokepurpp and Murda Beatz – Bless Yo Trap
09. "Ways" 
10. "For the Gang"

Evander Griiim – Raices
09. "Flavor"

Ski Mask the Slump God – Beware the Book of Eli
04. "Coolest Monkey in the Jungle" (featuring SahBabii)

Ty Dolla Sign – Beach House 3
26. "Simple" (featuring Yo Gotti)

Nick Grant – Dreamin' Out Loud
06. "Bleu Cheese"

Lil Skies
00. "World Rage"

G-Eazy – The Vault
03. "Power" (featuring Nef the Pharaoh and P-Lo)

Zoey Dollaz – Who Don't Like Dollaz 2
03. "Moonwalk" (featuring Moneybagg Yo)

Future and various artists – Superfly
12. "Money Train" (performed by Future featuring Young Thug and Gunna)

Wifisfuneral – Ethernet
03. "Genesis"

Jay Rock – Redemption
09. "Troopers"

Wiz Khalifa – Rolling Papers 2
09. "Karate" (featuring Chevy Woods)

Hoodrich Pablo Juan – Hoodwolf 2
02. "Bitch Nigga" 
10. "Vacation" (featuring Lil Duke) 
11. "Not To Be Trusted"

G Herbo – Swervo
04. "FoReal" 
12. "Letter"

Jazz Cartier – Fleurever
03. "VVS" (featuring Ktoe)

Travis Scott – Astroworld
03. "Sicko Mode" 
05. "Stop Trying To Be God" 
10. "NC-17"

Baka Not Nice – 4 Milli
04. "Dope Game"

Young Nudy – SlimeBall 3
04. "InDaStreets"

Comethazine – Bawksee
09. "Bring Out Dat Bag" (featuring Lil Yachty)

Bia – Nice Girls Finish Last: Cuidado
02. "Hollywood"

Young Thug – On the Rvn
01. "On The Run" (featuring Offset)

Quavo – Quavo Huncho
01. "Biggest Alley Oop" 
04. "Flip the Switch" (featuring Drake) 
11. "Fuck 12" (featuring Offset)

City Morgue – City Morgue Vol 1: Hell or High Water
09. "Snow on Tha Bluff"

Future and Juice Wrld – Wrld on Drugs
08. "Different" (featuring Yung Bans)

Lil Yachty – Nuthin' 2 Prove
08. "Different" (featuring Lil Baby)

MihTy – MihTy
09. "Lie 2 Me"

Vince Staples – FM!
03. "Don't Get Chipped"

Takeoff – The Last Rocket
04. "Vacation"

Tee Grizzley – Still My Moment
09. "Bitches on Bitches" (featuring Lil Pump)

88Glam – 88Glam2
10. "Racks" (featuring Gunna)

Jaden Smith – The Sunset Tapes: A Cool Tape Story
06. "Better Things"

Meek Mill – Championships
14. "Pay You Back" (featuring 21 Savage)

Ski Mask the Slump God – Stokeley
11. "Faucet Failure"

XXXTentacion – Skins
09. "I Don't Let Go"

Gucci Mane – Evil Genius
15. "Hard Feelings"

2019

Future – The Wizrd
07. "Call the Coroner"

G Herbo – Still Swervin
07. "Bug" 
10. "Do Yo Sh!t" 
11. "Never Scared" (featuring Juice Wrld) 
14. "Wilt Chamberlain"

Lil Pump – Harverd Dropout
11. "Vroom Vroom Vroom"

Offset – Father of 4
12. "Clout" (featuring Cardi B)

DaBaby – Baby on Baby
04. "Pony"

Zacari – Run Wild Run Free
05. "Young & Invincible" (featuring Lil Yachty)

Lil Gotit – Crazy But It's True
05. "Drip School" (featuring Lil Durk)

Nav – Bad Habits
02. "I'm Ready"

Young Chop – Don't Sleep
05. "Gimme That"

Travis Scott and Gucci Mane
00. "Murda"

Offset and 21 Savage
00. "Hethen"

KGibbs
00. "DaVille" (featuring Lil Uzi Vert)

Logic – Confessions of a Dangerous Mind
07. "Pardon My Ego" 
11. "Cocaine"

YG – 4Real 4Real
02. "Bottle Service"

Luci Lives – My Shitty Mixtape
05. "Scene Queen"

Lil Keed – Long Live Mexico
09. "Snake"

Gucci Mane – Delusions of Grandeur
03. "Special" (with Anuel AA)

Jaden Smith – Erys
08. "Got It"

Baby Keem – Die for My Bitch
11. "Buss Her Up" 
14. "Apologize"

Quality Control – Control the Streets, Volume 2
07. "I Suppose" (with Takeoff) 
09. "Pink Toes" (with Offset and DaBaby featuring Gunna) 
16. "Virgil" (with Quavo) 
22. "Come On" (with City Girls and Saweetie featuring DJ Durel)

Dame D.O.L.L.A. – Big D.O.L.L.A.
07. "Ricky Bobby"

Danny Wolf – Night of the Wolf
04. "Feel the Vibe" (featuring Lil Skies) 
07. "Wicked" (featuring Yung Bans)

Cam Ro – No Gearz
03. "Bittersweet"

NLE Choppa
00. "Always Workin"

Ameer Vann – Emmanuel
 03. "Glock 19"

Lil Mosey – Certified Hitmaker
11. "Space Coupe"

Swavay – Pure Pack
02. "Hood Dreamz"

Fabolous – Summertime Shootout 3: Coldest Summer Ever
03. "Talk To Me Nicely" (featuring Meek Mill)

Young Thug – So Much Fun
02. "Hop Off a Jet" (featuring Travis Scott)

AJ Tracey – AJ Tracey
20. "Zelda" (featuring SahBabii and Safe)

DY Krazy – DY Went Krazy
07. "Foes (featuring SBG Kemo and Bump J)

Fat Joe and Dre – Family Ties
07. "Big Splash" (featuring Remy Ma)

2020

Yo Gotti – Untrapped
10. "Dopechella" (featuring Rick Ross)

Jay Whiss – Peace of Mind
01. "Don't Change on Me" 
04. "Valet" (featuring Puffy L'z)

Blacc Zacc – Carolina Narco
05. "Coccy" (featuring Stunna 4 Vegas)

Jucee Froot – Black Sheep
02. "Wristwork"

Jack Harlow – Sweet Action
03. "I Wanna See Some Ass" (featuring JetsonMade)

Don Toliver – Heaven or Hell
04. "After Party" 
11. "No Photos"

Rich the Kid – Boss Man
10. "Easy"

Shindy – Byzantinische Rose
02. "Sony Pictures"

Jackboy – Jackboy
08. "Like a Million" (featuring Kodak Black)

Future – High Off Life
05. "Ridin Strikers" 
16. "Accepting My Flaws"

Aitch – Polaris
01. "Safe to Say"

City Girls – City on Lock
10. "Flewed Out" (featuring Lil Baby)

YoungBoy Never Broke Again – Top
15. "Reaper's Child"

Wiz Khalifa – The Saga of Wiz Khalifa
03. "On Top" 
05. "This Time Around"

Yung Gravy – Gasanova
02. "Martha Stewart"

Doe Boy and Southside – Demons R Us
05. "Stimulus Check" 
17. "Yesterday" (featuring Trippie Redd)

Nav – Emergency Tsunami
11. "Droppin Tears"

2 Chainz – So Help Me God!
01. "Lambo Wrist"

Jack Harlow – Thats What They All Say
02. "Face of My City" (featuring Lil Baby)

Tony Pirrone – You Made Me This Way
02. "Bruce Wayne"

2021

Lil Skies – Unbothered
14. "Mhmmm"

Jay NGF – PercMode
03. "Yu Gi Oh"

Only the Family – Loyal Bros
15. "Toxic" (performed by JusBlow600)

21 Lil Harold – Larry
01. "Savage"

Lil Tjay – Destined 2 Win
09. "Go Crazy"

Conway the Machine – La Maquina
09. "Scatter Brain" (featuring Ludacris and JID)

YSL Records – Slime Language 2
11. "Pots N Pans" (featuring Lil Duke and Nav)

YG and Mozzy – Kommunity Service
11. "Mad" (featuring Young M.A)

Migos – Culture III
12 "Jane"

G Herbo – 25
01. "I Don't Wanna Die" 
13. "Demands"

Rah Swish – Mayor of the Streets
07. "ILGAUSKAS"

Beny Jr – Samurai
06. "Dvd Ting" (with El Guincho)

OMB Bloodbath – Blood Sample
02. "Not Gang" (featuring EST Gee)

Rose' Riley – Rose' Season
05. "Blood Brothers"

BMW Kenny – Fear The Deer
03. "All Star"

Dame D.O.L.L.A. – Different On Levels The Lord Allowed
05. "For Me" (featuring Derrick Milano)

Kanye West – Donda
12. "Remote Control Pt 2" 
22. "Remote Control"

Arca – Kick II
05. "Luna Llena"

Nardo Wick – Who Is Nardo Wick?
13. "Wicked Freestyle"

2022

Kodak Black – Back for Everything
04. "Smackers"

Lil Durk – 7220
06. "Golden Child"

Kreative Kidd – Live from CO
04. "Colorado Freestyle"

Sean Paul – Scorcha
11. "Good Day"

Drake – Honestly, Nevermind
14. "Jimmy Cooks" (featuring 21 Savage)

Don Q – Corleone
03. "2 Tone AP" (featuring 42 Dugg)

Strick – The Machine, Vol. 3
03. "Tuscan"

Notes

References

External links
 
 
 

Song recordings produced by Cubeatz
Production discographies
Hip hop discographies
Discographies of German artists